The 2020 Italian Mixed Doubles Curling Championship was held from October 28, 2019 to January 26, 2020 in two stages: the group stage (round robin) from October 28, 2019 to January 17, 2020 and the playoff stage from January 24 to 26, 2020.

21 teams took part in the championship, with the 8 best teams promoted to the playoff stage.

The winners of the championship were the Amos Mosaner / Alice Cobelli team, who beat the Joël Retornaz / Angela Romei team in the final. The bronze medal was won by the Giacomo Colli / Diana Gaspari team, who won the bronze match against the Mattia Giovanella / Chiara Zanotelli team.

Team Amos Mosaner / Alice Cobelli will represent Italy at the 2020 World Mixed Doubles Curling Championship.

Teams

Round robin

Group A
(Qualificazione - Girone Pinerolo)
Was held in Pinerolo from October 28 to December 27, 2019

Group B
(Qualificazione - Girone Cembra)
Was held in Cembra from November 29 to December 15, 2019

Group C
(Qualificazione - Girone Cortina)
Was held in Cortina d'Ampezzo from November 13, 2019 to January 17, 2020

Group D
(Qualificazione - Girone Sesto S. Giovanni)
Was held in Pinerolo from November 30 to December 1, 2019

Playoffs
(Finale)
Was held as "double knockout" in Cembra from January 24 to 26, 2020

Stage 1

Stage 2

Bronze-medal match
January 26, 15:30

Final
January 26, 15:30

Final standings

References

See also
2020 Italian Men's Curling Championship
2020 Italian Women's Curling Championship
2020 Italian Mixed Curling Championship
2020 Italian Junior Curling Championships

Italian Mixed Doubles Curling Championship
Italian Mixed Doubles Curling Championship
Italian Mixed Doubles Curling Championship
Curling
Curling
Sport in Trentino
Italian